George Japhet Waweru (born 12 October 1978) is a Kenyan footballer. He played in 41 matches for the Kenya national football team from 1999 to 2007. He was also named in Kenya's squad for the 2004 African Cup of Nations tournament.

References

1978 births
Living people
Kenyan footballers
Kenya international footballers
2004 African Cup of Nations players
Place of birth missing (living people)
Association football defenders